The athletics competitions at the 2022 Mediterranean Games in Oran, Algeria took place between 30 June and 3 July at the Oran Olympic Stadium.

Medal summary

Men's events

Women's events

Medal table

Participating nations

 (1)

References

External links

 Live results
 Results book

Sports at the 2022 Mediterranean Games
2022
Mediterranean Games
2022